William Healy Sullivan (October 12, 1922 – October 11, 2013) was an American  Foreign Service career officer who served as ambassador to Laos from 1964 to 1969, the Philippines from 1973 to 1977, and Iran from 1977 to 1979.

Early life and career
Sullivan was born in Cranston, Rhode Island, and graduated from Brown University as salutatorian and Class Orator of the class of 1943.  His senior address was on America's duty to "aid in repairing not only the damage suffered by our Allies, but also that sustained by our enemies."  After graduation, he entered the Navy and served as a gunnery officer on a destroyer, the USS Hambleton. The Hambleton escorted North Atlantic convoys, and served off North Africa and Italy before participating in the D-Day invasion of Normandy and the invasion of Okinawa. He had the senior watch on the Hambleton when it entered Yokohama harbor for the Japanese surrender.

After obtaining a joint graduate degree from Harvard University and the Fletcher School at Tufts University under the GI Bill, Sullivan joined the Foreign Service and was posted to Bangkok, Thailand.  During that tour, he was in brief communication with the Viet Cong, who were in exile in northern Thailand. His subsequent assignments were to Calcutta, India, Tokyo, Japan, Naples and Rome, Italy, and The Hague, Netherlands.

His habit of speaking his mind with force and candor grated on more than one superior, and for years he languished in the lower grades.  Then, in the Kennedy administration, he was assigned to the office of W. Averell Harriman, the Assistant Secretary for the Far East.  Harriman, no admirer of blandness, immediately recognized his abilities.

Sullivan served as Harriman's deputy at Geneva negotiations about the future of Laos in 1961 and during the Cuban Missile Crisis. When the Vietnam War heated up, he served briefly as deputy chief of mission to the U.S. Embassy in Saigon.

His nephew is former United States Deputy Secretary of State and current United States Ambassador to Russia John Sullivan.

Ambassador to Laos

In 1964, Sullivan began his tenure as Ambassador to Laos. During his service in Laos, Sullivan broached negotiations with the North Vietnamese, capitalizing on his prior contacts with the Viet Cong in Thailand nearly 20 years previously,  for the initiation of the Paris Peace Talks that ended the U.S. involvement in the Vietnam War.  Pursuant to an order by President Kennedy, all U.S. military operations in Laos were under the direct supervision of the Ambassador. As Ambassador to Laos during Project 404, and he also personally directed the bombing of the Ho Chi Minh trail. This civilian control and the restriction on  military operations rankled the military. He was also involved in Lima Site 85 in Laos: "...Major Richard Secord, who was responsible for the security of Lima Site 85, was concerned about the safety of the unarmed USAF technicians working there dressed as civilians. He requested Green Berets be assigned as on-site security. Ambassador Sullivan turned down the request. Sullivan repeatedly insisted the "civilian personnel" at Lima Site 85 should not be armed, but Secord decided to equip the technicians with weapons. M16 rifles, fragmentation grenades, concussion grenades, and other small arms were then brought in. Secord said that given the site's meager defenses, he felt the site could not be held against a serious assault.

Secord's fears were justified, as USAF reconnaissance aircraft regularly flying over northeastern Laos in 1967 revealed that the paved roads constructed by the North Vietnamese were obviously approaching Phou Pha Thi. Road construction activities were observed along Routes 6 and 19, which connected Dien Bien Phu in North Vietnam with Phou Pha Thi and Nam Bac in Laos.

Realizing the PAVN would try to destroy the installation, Secord advised the U.S. Embassy in Vientiane to evacuate all U.S. personnel. However, high-ranking U.S. officials insisted that Lima Site 85 should operate as long as possible, as it helped save the lives of U.S. pilots every day it remained operational. After he left Laos, Sullivan returned to Washington to coordinate the U.S. participation in the Paris Peace Talks. Thereafter, he was appointed Ambassador to the Philippines. South Vietnam fell while he in the Philippines, and Sullivan orchestrated the evacuation of hundreds of thousands of people through that nation. He was able to convince President Marcos to permit the fleeing South Vietnamese navy to land, despite a demand from the new Communist Vietnamese government for its return, by arguing that the ships were in fact U.S. property after the fall of the South Vietnamese government, as a result of the terms of their sale to that state.

Ambassador to Iran

Sullivan next served as U.S. Ambassador to Iran, arriving just before President Jimmy Carter's visit to the Shah of Iran in December 1977. In the 1970s, America had extremely close military and economic links with Iran. 

As demonstrations increased in scale, Sullivan came into conflict with National Security Advisor Zbigniew Brzezinski over a resolution that would be acceptable to American interests. Sullivan felt that compromise with the demonstrators and the Ayatollah Khomeini was necessary, while Brzezinski favored strong, unconditional support for the Shah and Iranian Prime Minister Shapour Bakhtiar. Although Brzezinski got his way, the demonstrators prevailed; in late 1978, Sullivan cabled Washington that it might be necessary to consider policy options if the military proved unable to assure the shah's continuance in power and the shah should depart from Iran. In January 1979, the White House instructed Sullivan to inform the shah that the U.S. government felt he should leave the country.

On February 1, 1979, the exiled Khomeini returned to Tehran. Days later, with Tehran in revolution and all organs of state essentially nonexistent, Under Secretary of State David D. Newsom called from the White House Situation Room with a question for Sullivan:  "The National Security Advisor (Brzezinski) has asked for your view of the possibility of a coup d'état by the Iranian military to take over from the Bakhtiar government, which is clearly faltering."

Sullivan allegedly replied, "Tell Brzezinski to fuck off."

"That's not a very helpful comment," Newsom noted.

"You want it translated into Polish?" Sullivan hung up.

On February 14, 1979, the U.S. Embassy in Teheran was overrun by several different armed groups. The Embassy staff was briefly taken hostage, but later released to the caretaker Iranian government. This crisis, which predated the larger Iran Hostage Crisis by nine months, became sarcastically known as the "St. Valentine's Day Open House" owing to the date on which it occurred.

He wrote in his autobiography: "I had recommended that we accept the fact that a revolution was in progress and seek to use our not inconsiderable influence to steer its success toward its more moderate protagonists." This view, however, was not shared by Washington, and Sullivan was recalled in March 1979. Shortly after, on April 1, 1979, Iran officially became an Islamic Republic.

After Sullivan left Iran, the Embassy drew down to a skeleton staff, under the direction of Chargé d'Affaires Bruce Laingen, who later became one of 52 Americans held hostage by militant Iranian students. 

He headed the American Assembly at Columbia University, which had been briefly headed by General Dwight Eisenhower before he was elected President, from 1979 to 1986. In 1981, Sullivan published Mission to Iran, a memoir of his time as ambassador. His autobiography, Obbligato: Notes on a Foreign Service Career, was published in 1984.

Later career
He later served on the boards of the Lincoln Center, the International Center, and the U.S.–Vietnam Trade Council.

In 1988 he received an overture to begin steps towards U.S.–Vietnam normalization from his former North Vietnamese negotiations counterpart Nguyen Co Thach, who had become Vietnam's Deputy Prime Minister and Foreign Minister.  Sullivan first traveled back to Vietnam in May 1989 to meet with Minister Thach, founded the U.S.–Vietnam Trade Council, and from then continued to work on steps towards the historic normalization.

Following retirement, he lived a quiet life in Cuernavaca, Mexico, and later, Washington, D.C.

William H. Sullivan died on October 11, 2013, one day before his 91st birthday. He is survived by four children and six grandchildren.

References

External links
Brief summary of Mission to Iran

1922 births
2013 deaths
People from Cranston, Rhode Island
People of the Iranian Revolution
Ambassadors of the United States to Laos
Ambassadors of the United States to the Philippines
Ambassadors of the United States to Iran
Writers from Rhode Island
People of the Laotian Civil War
United States Foreign Service personnel
Brown University alumni
United States Navy personnel of World War II
American expatriates in Thailand
American expatriates in India
American expatriates in Japan
American expatriates in Italy
American expatriates in the Netherlands
American expatriates in Vietnam
20th-century American diplomats